The Körunda Ladies Open was a women's professional golf tournament on the Swedish Golf Tour played between 1995 and 2011. It was always held near Nynäshamn just south of Stockholm, Sweden.

Winners

References

Swedish Golf Tour (women) events
Defunct sports competitions in Sweden
Recurring sporting events established in 1995
Recurring sporting events disestablished in 2011